Scarle may refer to:

Surname
John Scarle, Lord Chancellor of England
Robert Scarle, MP for Rutland
Walter Scarle, MP for Rutland

Other uses
North Scarle